This is a list of ships owned or operated by Danish shipping company Maersk

Active ships
The following lists are active ships of the Maersk fleet as of December 2022.

Container ships

Chemical/product tankers

References

Ships of Maersk